Euzanne is an alpine pasture located in the municipality of Bex in switzerland.

References

Landforms of the canton of Vaud